Villa Valmarana may refer to several Venetian villas which belonged to the Valmarana family:
 Villa Valmarana (Vigardolo), in Vigardolo of Monticello Conte Otto, designed in 1542 by Andrea Palladio
 Villa Valmarana (Lisiera), in Lisiera of Bolzano Vicentino, designed about 1563 by Andrea Palladio
 Villa Capra "La Rotonda" in Vicenza, designed by Andrea Palladio
 Villa Valmarana Ai Nani, in Vicenza, with frescos by Giambattista and Giovanni Domenico Tiepolo
 Villa Valmarana (Mira), in Mira along the Riviera del Brenta
 Villa Valmarana Morosini, in Altavilla Vicentina, 1724, by Francesco Muttoni